Gerhard Aigner (born 1 September 1943 in Regensburg, Bavaria, Germany) is a retired football executive. Aigner became on 22 September 1989 General Secretary of UEFA. The position of the General Secretary was renamed to Chief Executive on 3 March 1999. He retired from the post at on 7 November 2003.

Since 2006, Gerhard Aigner was a board member of Euro-Sportring and in 2010 he became the chairman. Euro-Sportring is a non-profit foundation that organizes international sports tournaments in Europe, particularly for youth teams of amateur clubs.

Aigner is an honorary member of UEFA.

See also
Erich Gehbauer

References

Association football executives
1943 births
People from Regensburg
Living people
UEFA officials
Businesspeople from Bavaria
German sports executives and administrators